The 14th Pan American Games were held in Santo Domingo, Dominican Republic, from August 1 to August 17, 2003.

Medals

Gold

Men's hammer throw: Juan Ignacio Cerra

Men's K-1 500 m: Javier Correa
Men's K-1 1,000 m: Javier Correa

Men's individual pursuit: Edgardo Simón
Women's mountain bike: Jimena Florit
Men's madison: Walter Pérez and Juan Curuchet

Men's tournament: Argentina national football team
Ezequiel Lázaro, Juan Pablo Carrizo, Marcos Aguirre, Jesús Méndez, Oscar Roberto Cornejo, Gustavo Eberto, Franco Sanchírico, Franco Cángele, Joel Barbosa, Hugo Colace, Alexis Cabrera, Alejandro Alonso, Marcos Galarza, Osmar Ferreyra, Pablo Barzola, Walter García, Raúl Gorostegui, Maximiliano López, Jonathan Bottinelli and Emanuel Perrone

Men's 100 m freestyle: José Meolans
Women's 400 m individual medley: Georgina Bardach

Silver

Men's K-2 500 m: Miguel Correa and Fernando Redondo
Women's K-1 500 m: Fernanda Lauro

Men's team pursuit: Ángel Colla, Guillermo Brunetta, Walter Pérez and Edgardo Simón

Men's tournament: Argentina
Women's tournament: Argentina

Men's 100 m butterfly: José Meolans
Women's 100 m freestyle: Florencia Szigeti

Women's –67 kg: Vanina Sánchez

Men's –94 kg: Darío Lecman
Women's –75 kg: Nora Koppel

Bronze

Men's super heavyweight (+91 kg): Sébastian Ceballo

Men's K-4 1,000 m: Damian Dossena, Rodrigo Caffa, Miguel Correa and Fernando Redondo
Women's K-2 500 m: Sabrina Ameghino and María Romano
Women's K-4 500 m: Vanesia Pittao, Mari Ducrett, Sabrina Ameghino and María Romano

Men's kumite (+80 kg): Leandro Monzón

Men's –80 kg: Darío Coria
Women's +67 kg: Patricia Riccautti

Men's individual race: Oscar Galíndez

Results by event

Athletics

Road

Field

Decathlon

Alejandra García
Javier Benitez
Javier Carrique
Solange Witteveen

Basketball

Men's tournament
Preliminary round
Lost to United States (79-80)
Lost to Uruguay (81-84)
Defeated Puerto Rico (92–67)
Classification matches
5th/8th place: Defeated Canada (88–86)
5th/6th place: Lost to Mexico (90–95) → 6th place
Team roster
Bruno Lábaque
Diego Lo Grippo
Javier González Romana
Paolo Quinteros
Julio Mázzaro
Hernán Pelleteri
Patricio Pratto
Diego Alba
Martín Leiva
Diego Cavaco
Matías Sandes
Diego Guaita

Women's tournament
Preliminary round
Defeated Dominican Republic (76-52)
Lost to Brazil (43-86)
Lost to Cuba (57-83)
Lost to United States (78-93)
Lost to Canada (57-62) → 5th place
Team roster
Andrea Gale
Laura Nicolini
Erica Sanchez
Maria Fernández
Veronica Soberon
Paula Gatti
Macela Paoletta
Andrea Fernández
Vanesa Pires
Natalia Rios
Irene Cacciapuoti
Gisela Vega

Badminton

Joaquin Berrios
Santiago Castro
Hugo Madsen

Bowling

Ruben Favero
Maria Lanzavechia
Lucas Legnani
Maria Quinteros

Boxing

Canoeing

Roman Turqui
Javier Correa
Damian Dossena
Fernando Redondo
Maria Fernanda Lauro
Sabrina Ameghino
Miguel Correa
Juan Pablo Bergero
Leonardo Niveiro
Matias Machicote
Liliana Pittao
Rodrigo Caffa
Maria Ducrett
Maria Romano

Cycling

Ángel Colla
Edgardo Simón
Walter Pérez
Guillermo Brunetta
Maximiliano Richeze
Juan Curuchet
Valeria Pintos
Graciela Martínez

Mountain bike
Carlos Gennero
 Final — + 1 lap (→ 9th place)
Jimena Florit
 Final — 2:02.59 (→ 1st place)

Equestrian

Gregorio Werthein
Gabriel Armando
Mariana Motta Pini
Roxana Rubaldo
Justo Albarracin
Ricardo Kierkergaard
Maria Andrea Guerreño

Fencing

Alejandra Carbone
Victor Groupierre
Diego Drajer
Lucas Saucedo
Alberto Perez Ghersi
Leandro Marchetti
Juan Barbosa
Santiago Induni
Alberto González Viaggio

Football

Men's tournament

Team roster
Ezequiel Lazaro
Juan Pablo Carrizo
Marcos Aguirre
Jesus Mendez
Oscar Roberto Cornejo
Gustavo Eberto
Franco Sanchirico
Franco Cángele
Joel Barbosa
Hugo Colace
Alexis Cabrera
Alejandro Alonso
Marcos Galarza
Osmar Ferreyra
Pablo Barsola
Walter García
Raúl Gorostegui
Maxi López
Jonathan Bottinelli
Emanuel Perrone

Women's tournament

Team roster
Nancy Díaz
Karina Alvariza
Marisa Gerez
Yanina Gaitán
Noelia López
Andrea Gonsabate
Mariela Ricotti
Rosana Gomez
Marisol Medina
Romina Ferro
Mariela Coronel
Natalia Gatti
Vanina Correa
Valeria Cotelo
Clarisa Huber
Fabiana Vallejos
Analia Soledad Almeida
Eva González

Gymnastics

Anahi Sosa
Maria Antonella Yacobelli
Ruth Vasta
Melñina Sirolli
Gabriela Parigi
Lucas Chiarlo
Martin Passalenti
Federico Molinari
Eric Pedersini
Sergio Erbojo
Mario Gorosito
Celeste Carnevale
Cecilia Stancato
Maria Conde

Handball

Men's tournament
Team roster
Lucas Guerra
Andrés Kogovsek
Eric Gull
Alejo Carrara
Cristian Canzoniero
Martin Viscovich
Alejandro Marine
Gonzalo Viscovich
Federico Besasso
Bruno Civelli
Gonzalo Carou
Rodolfo Carou
Rodolfo Jung
Sergio Crevatin
Fernando García
Cristian Plati

Women's tournament
Team roster
Giselle Pintos
Sabrina Nievas
Florencia Am
Eliana Fontana
Karina Seif
Pamela Sampietro
Natacha Melillo
Valentina Kogan
Georgina Visciglia
Guadalupe Roman
Mariana Mansilla
Maria Decilio
Marianella Larroca
Maricel Bueno
Maria Barile

Field hockey

Men's tournament
Team roster
Carlos Retegui
Pablo Moreira
Jorge Lombi
Mariano Chao
Mario Almada
Ezequiel Paulon
German Orozco
Fernando Zylberberg
Tomás MacCormik
Matias Vila
Fernando Oscaris
Lucas Cammareri
Marco Riccardi
Juan Esparis
Juan Pablo Hourquebie
Matías Paredes

Women's tournament
Team roster
Maria Paz Ferrari
Magdalena Aicega
Alejandra Gulla
Mariela Antoniska
Mercedes Margalot
Ayelen Stepnik
Mariana Di Giacomo
Mariana González Oliva
Cecilia Rognoni
Maria de la Paz Hernández
Luciana Aymar
Natali Doreski
Claudia Burkart
Maria del Carril
Agustina García
Angela Cattaneo

Judo

Miguel Albarracin
Orlando Baccino
Lorena Briceño
Elizabeth Copes
Daniela Krukower
Jorge Lencina
Andres Laforte
Rodrigo Lucenti
Melissa Rodríguez
Diego Rosati
Ariel Sganga

Karate

Virginia Acevedo
Lucio Martínez
Leandro Monzon
Silvina Perez
Leonardo Santucho

Rowing

Ulf Lienhard
Federico Steindl
Gustavo de Ezcurra
Sebastian Massa
Damian Ordás
Ariel Suarez
Sebastian Fernández
Marcos Morales
Walter Naneder
Jose Czcy
Fernando Loglen
Santiago Fernández
Siego Wehrendt

Sailing

Miguel Saubidet
Domingo Contesi
Cristian Petersen
Hernan Esteban Marino
Marcos Galvan
Juan Ignacio Grimaldi
Matias Capizzano
Diego Romero
Luis Calabrese
Jorge Engelhard
Florencia Cerutti
Catalina Walther

Shooting

Melisa Gil
Angel Velarte
Pablo Alvarez
Amelia Fournel
Daniel Felizia
Rafael Olivera Araus
Hugo Rodulfo
Masimino Modesti
Ana Maria Gibaut
Cyntia Kholer
Manuel Britos
Cecilia Zeid
Ariel Romero
Horacio Gil
Juan Dasque

Softball

Men's tournament
Team roster
Ricardo Biondi
Emiliano di Centa
Andres Gamarci
Julio Gamarci
Gustavo Guerrinieri
José Guerrinieri
Cristian Lacout
Guillrmo Correa
Pablo Montero
Gustavo Muñoz
Fernando Dagostino
José Luis Pintos
Pablo Pintos
Luis Rosales
Diego Salguero
Pablo Segui

Swimming

Men's competitions

Pablo Abal
Cristian Soldano
Georgina Bardach
Florencia Szigeti
Eduardo Otero
Mariana Bertelotti

Women's competitions

Squash

Jorge Keen
Robertino Pezzota
Rodrigo Pezzota

Table tennis

Gaston Alto
Kiu Song
Martin Paradela
Pablo Tabachnik

Taekwondo

Dario Coria
Carola Lopez Rodríguez
Laura Lopez Rodríguez
Patricia Ricciuti
Vanina Beron

Tennis

Carlos Berlocq
Jorgelina Cravero
Brian Dabul
Natalia Garbellotto
Vanina García Sokol
Cristian Villagrán

Triathlon

Water polo

Men's tournament
Team roster
Hernan Mazzini
Mariano Zanotti
Federico Zuljan
Nicolas Bianchi
Juan Montane
Fernando Scursoni
Juan Felicce
Ramiro Gil
Tomas Bulgheroni
Silvio Corsi
Diego Giusto
Bruno Testa
Juan Manuel Albareda

Wrestling

Javier Broschini
Mauricio Cabello
Lucas Garralda
Romina Gonzalez
Daniel Iglesias

See also
 Argentina at the 2004 Summer Olympics

References

cpdmardelplata
Argentine Olympic Committee

Nations at the 2003 Pan American Games
P
2003